Arachnothryx fosbergii is a species of flowering plant in the family Rubiaceae. It is endemic to Ecuador.

References

Endemic flora of Ecuador
Guettardeae
Endangered plants
Taxonomy articles created by Polbot